Žetale is a village in eastern Slovenia, on the border with Croatia. It is the seat  of the Municipality of Žetale. The area traditionally belonged to the region of Styria. It is now included in the Drava Statistical Region.

History
Žetale was first mentioned in written documents dating to 1228, and old parish documents record its name as Schiltarin. The area was subject to repeated Ottoman invasion, and there are pseudoetymological claims that the village is named after a supposed defender of the village named Žetal. In fact, the name is derived from Middle High German Schiltern. As of 2018, the village of Žetale had a population of 356.

Festivals
A chestnut festival in October is a locally well known. There is an annual pilgrimage called Jarmek held on 15 August, the feast day of the Assumption of Mary and a public holiday in Slovenia, where pilgrims walk to Mary Help of Christians Church, known locally as Marijatrošt.

Notable people
Notable people that were born or lived in Žetale include:
 Anton Hajšek (1827–1907): patriot and publisher of the writings of Anton Martin Slomšek
 Jože Topolovec (1934–2010): writer (pseudonym Jože Haložan)

References

External links

 Žetale on Geopedia

Populated places in the Municipality of Žetale